McCollum Fish Weir is a historic Native American fish weir located near Lockhart, Chester County, South Carolina.  The site consists of a V-shaped fish trap or weir located on the Broad River approximately 500–600 feet upstream from the McCollum Mound, from which it gets its name.

It was listed on the National Register of Historic Places in 1974.

References

Agricultural buildings and structures on the National Register of Historic Places in South Carolina
Archaeological sites on the National Register of Historic Places in South Carolina
Buildings and structures in Chester County, South Carolina
National Register of Historic Places in Chester County, South Carolina
Weirs